Suboestophora hispanica is a species of small air-breathing land snail, a terrestrial pulmonate gastropod mollusk in the family Trissexodontidae within the Helicoidea.

Suboestophora hispanica is the type species of the genus Suboestophora.

Distribution 
This species is endemic to Spain.  The type locality is Valencia, Spain.

Description 
Suboestophora hispanica was originally described under the name Helicodonta hispanica by Gerard Pierre Laurent Kalshoven Gude in 1910.

Gude's original text (the type description) reads as follows:

References
This article incorporates public domain text from reference.

Trissexodontidae
Endemic molluscs of the Iberian Peninsula
Gastropods described in 1910
Taxonomy articles created by Polbot